A list of films produced in France in 1979.

See also
1979 in France

Notes

References

External links
 French films of 1979 at the Internet Movie Database
French films of 1979 at Cinema-francais.fr

1979
Films
French